Zalesie Górne  is a village in the administrative district of Gmina Piaseczno, within Piaseczno County, Masovian Voivodeship, in east-central Poland.

Zalesie Górne is a village in the administrative district of Gmina, within piaseczno County, Masovian Voivodeship, in Gmina Piaseczno, summer resort situated about 3 km South-East of Piaseczno, 28 km from the Centre of Warsaw.

The village was founded in the 1930s, and as of 2013 its population was 3867. Located on provincial road No.873 and with a station on the Warsaw-Radom Railway line the village is today an affluent commuter suburb of the Capital. The surrounding forests are likewise a popular vacation spot for Warsaw residents.

Landmarks in the town include the school, Railway station, and the Roman Catholic parish of St. Hubert. The town lies adjacent to the Chojnów Landscape Park.

Gallery

References

Villages in Piaseczno County